Scalesia aspera is a species of flowering plant in the family Asteraceae. It is found only in the Galapagos Islands of Ecuador. It is threatened by habitat loss.

References

aspera
Flora of the Galápagos Islands
Vulnerable plants
Taxonomy articles created by Polbot